The Commish is an American comedy-drama television series that aired on ABC. The series focuses on the work and home life of a suburban police commissioner (Michael Chiklis) in upstate New York. It ran for five seasons from 1991 to 1996, airing 94 episodes.

Series overview

Episodes

Season 1 (1991–92)

Season 2 (1992–93)

Season 3 (1993–94)

Season 4 (1994–95)

Season 5 (1995–96)

External links 
 
 

Lists of American drama television series episodes